PS Minerva was a  passenger paddle steamer that J&G Thomson launched in 1893 for the Glasgow and South Western Railway (G&SWR). She served with the Royal Navy from 1916 and was sold into civilian service in Turkey in 1924. She was scrapped by 1928.

History
J&G Thomson of Clydebank launched Minerva for the G&SWR on 6 May 1893.

She worked various G&SWR ferry routes, commonly to Rothesay and the Kyles, and in winter to the Isle of Arran. In 1902 she was re-boilered, as a result of which her funnel was moved further forward.

In June 1916 the Admiralty requisitioned her for the Royal Navy as an auxiliary patrol vessel. The Turkish Navy captured her in 1917. After the Armistice of Mudros in 1918 she returned to the Royal Navy. From April 1919 she served as a minesweeper.

In 1924 she was sold to Turkish owners, who operated her as a ferry on the Bosphorus. She had been scrapped by 1928.

References

1893 ships
Little Ships of Dunkirk
Minesweepers of the Royal Navy
Patrol vessels of the Royal Navy
Ships built on the River Clyde
Steamships of the United Kingdom
Steamships of Turkey